Walter Dawson (born April 26, 1982 in Portland, Oregon) is an Alzheimer's disease activist. He is the son of
British immigrant Cecil Dawson and Oregon native Clara Dawson. As a young boy, Dawson captured the attention of America's leaders and national media by undertaking a letter writing campaign on behalf of his father and other sufferers of Alzheimer's. 
In 1992, Dawson became a national spokesperson for the Alzheimer's Association. In this role, Dawson traveled to Washington, D.C. several times to testify before the United States Senate and House of Representative committees about his family's experiences. While in Washington, Dawson was granted access to several senior legislators and public officials including President Bill Clinton and Vice-President Al Gore.

Overview
Dawson began his letter-writing campaign after the cost of his father's long care placed the family in serious financial peril. National Public Radio became the first nationwide media outlet to support his original letter-writing campaign, after Dawson (aged 9) read one of his letters on the air. Soon afterwards, NBC, CBS and Nickelodeon picked up the story of Dawson's campaign on behalf of his father and other sufferers of Alzheimer's disease. They covered the Dawson family and their struggle for health care reform over numerous programs, gaining national exposure for the issues that mattered to sufferers of the disease and their families.

Early adulthood
While an undergraduate at the University of Portland, Dawson was elected Student Body Vice-President and served as President of the Student Senate.

References

External links
Testimony of Shelley Fabares, National Board Member, Alzheimer's Association, March 23, 2004 (mentions Walter Dawson)

Activists from Portland, Oregon
American activists
Alzheimer's disease
University of Portland alumni
Living people
1982 births